The 2002 Women's FA Community Shield was the third Women's FA Community Shield, as with its male equivalent, the Community Shield is an annual football match played between the winners of the previous season's league and the previous season's Women's FA Cup. The match was contested between Fulham and Arsenal, Fulham via penalty shootout.

References

Women's FA Community Shield
Community Shield
Community Shield
Community Shield
Community Shield